The Grand Lodge of Newfoundland and Labrador of Ancient Free & Accepted Masons is the regular Grand Lodge with authority over Freemasons in the Canadian province of Newfoundland and Labrador.  It was consecrated on November 1, 1997, with 32 lodges, of which 28 are still extant as of 2020, by the United Grand Lodge of England.  Its current Grand Master is Most Worshipful Brother W. Donald Vokey.

The Grand Lodge used to be headquartered in the historic Masonic Temple in St. John's, which it shared with the other regular body of craft masonry in Newfoundland and Labrador, the District Grand Lodge of Newfoundland and Labrador of the Grand Lodge of Scotland, in addition to several appendant bodies.  Since 2009, the headquarters is now located in Freemason's Hall, in the city of Mount Pearl.

References

External links
Official website

Newfoundland and Labrador
Non-profit organizations based in Newfoundland and Labrador
Freemasonry in Canada